WIKK (103.5 FM, "The Eagle") is a radio station broadcasting a classic rock format and licensed to serve the community of Newton, Illinois, United States.  The station is currently owned by Forcht Broadcasting and features programming from Westwood One.

Forcht Group owns two other Illinois radio stations - WVLN and WSEI in Olney.

References

External links
WIKK's website
Forcht Broadcasting Website

IKK
Classic rock radio stations in the United States